Dictyoloma is a genus of flowering plants that belongs to the family Rutaceae.

References 

Cneoroideae
Rutaceae genera